The 2002 FIFA World Cup, also branded as Korea Japan 2002, was the 17th FIFA World Cup, the quadrennial football world championship for men's national teams organized by FIFA. It was held from 31 May to 30 June 2002 at sites in South Korea and Japan, with its final match hosted by Japan at International Stadium in Yokohama.

A field of 32 teams qualified for this World Cup, which was the first to be held in Asia, the first to be held outside of the Americas or Europe, as well as the first to be jointly-hosted by more than one nation. China, Ecuador, Senegal, and Slovenia made their World Cup debuts. 

The tournament had several upsets and surprise results, which included the defending champions France being eliminated in the group stage after earning a single point without scoring a goal and second favourites Argentina also being eliminated in the group stage. South Korea managed to reach the semi-finals, beating  Poland, Portugal, Italy and Spain en route. They became the first team from outside of the UEFA, CONMEBOL, and CONCACAF regions to reach the semi-finals of a World Cup. However, the most potent team at the tournament, Brazil, prevailed, winning the final against Germany 2–0, making them the first and only country to have won the World Cup five times. The victory qualified Brazil for the 2003 and subsequently 2005 FIFA Confederations Cups, its fourth and fifth Confederations Cup appearance in a row. In the third place play-off match against South Korea, Turkey won 3–2, taking third place in only their second ever FIFA World Cup, and scored the fastest goal in the FIFA World Cup history (10.8 seconds after kick-off).

The 2002 World Cup was also the last one to use the golden goal rule and the last one to use the same ball for all matches. Starting in 2006 and continuing to the present, a ball with the same technical specifics but different colors has been used in the final.

Host selection

South Korea and Japan were selected as hosts by FIFA on 31 May 1996. Initially, South Korea, Japan and Mexico presented three rival bids. South Korea's entry into the race was seen by some as a response to the bid of political and sporting rival Japan. FIFA leaders were split on whom to favor as host as politics within the world governing body held sway. With Mexico regarded as a long shot, the battle to host the tournament came down to South Korea and Japan. The two Asian rivals went on a massive and expensive PR blitz around the world, prompting Sultan Ahmad Shah, the head of the Asian Football Confederation, to step in. FIFA boss João Havelange had long backed the Japanese bid, but his rival in FIFA, UEFA chief Lennart Johansson, sought to undermine Havelange's plans. UEFA and the AFC viewed co-hosting between the two Asian rivals as the best option. South Korea and Japan were finally faced with a choice of having no World Cup or a shared World Cup and they reluctantly chose to go along with co-hosting. South Korea and Japan were chosen unanimously as co-hosts in preference to Mexico. This was the first World Cup to be hosted by more than one country, the second being the 2026 World Cup, which will be hosted by the United States, Mexico and Canada. This is also the first ever World Cup to be hosted in Asia, the other being the 2022 World Cup, hosted by Qatar, twenty years later. The general secretary of South Korea's bidding committee, Song Young-shik, stated that FIFA was interested in staging some matches in North Korea in order to aid Korean reunification, but it was ruled out.

At the time the decision was made, Japan had never qualified for a World Cup finals (although the Japanese did subsequently qualify for the 1998 competition). The only other countries to have been awarded a World Cup without previously having competed in a final tournament are Italy in 1934 and Qatar in 2022 (Uruguay hosted the first World Cup in 1930 so there was no prior tournament; they were defending Olympic champions from 1928).

The unusual choice of host proved an issue for football fans in Europe, used to watching international matches on or close to their time zone. With games taking place in the European morning, some schools and businesses chose to open late on match days or set up communal watching events before the start of work.

Qualification

199 teams attempted to qualify for the 2002 World Cup. The qualification process began with the preliminary draw held in Tokyo on 7 December 1999. Defending champions France and co-hosts South Korea and Japan qualified automatically and did not have to play any qualification matches. This was the final World Cup in which the defending champions qualified automatically.

14 places were contested by UEFA teams (Europe), five by CAF teams (Africa), four by CONMEBOL teams (South America), four by AFC teams (Asia) and three by CONCACAF teams (North and Central America and the Caribbean). The remaining two places were decided by playoffs between AFC and UEFA and between CONMEBOL and OFC (Oceania). Four nations qualified for the finals for the first time: China, Ecuador, Senegal and Slovenia. As of 2022, this was the last occasion on which the Republic of Ireland and Turkey qualified for a FIFA World Cup finals, and the only time that China have qualified, as well as the last time that Australia and Switzerland failed to qualify.

Turkey qualified for the first time since 1954, Poland and Portugal both qualified for the first time since 1986 and Costa Rica and Uruguay qualified for the first time since 1990. Sweden, Russia and the Republic of Ireland also returned after missing the 1998 World Cup. 1998 semi-finalists the Netherlands, three-time participants in the 1990s Romania and Colombia, and Bulgaria, Morocco and Norway, who had participated in the previous two finals tournaments, alongside Chile, Scotland and Iran which participated in the latest edition, failed to qualify, while South Korea set a record by appearing in a fifth successive finals tournament, the first nation from outside Europe or the Americas to achieve this feat.

All seven previous World Cup-winning nations (Argentina, Brazil, England, France, Germany, Italy, and Uruguay) qualified, which broke the record of most previous champions at a tournament before the record was broken again in 2014. The highest ranked team not to qualify for the finals was Colombia (ranked 4th), while the lowest ranked team that did qualify was China PR (ranked 50th).

List of qualified teams
The following 32 teams, shown with final pre-tournament rankings, qualified for the final tournament:

AFC (4)
 
 
 
 
CAF (5)
 
 
 
 
 
OFC (0)
 None qualified

CONCACAF (3)
 
 
 
CONMEBOL (5)
 
 
 
 
 

UEFA (15)

Venues
South Korea and Japan each provided 10 venues, the vast majority of them newly built for the tournament. Groups A–D played all their matches in South Korea and Groups E–H played all their matches in Japan. The stadiums in Daegu, Suwon, Yokohama and Saitama all hosted 4 matches each, while the other 16 stadiums hosted 3 matches each. Notably, no matches were played in Tokyo, making it the first capital of a host country not to have a World Cup venue.

A cross denotes an indoor stadium.

Match officials

There was much controversy over the refereeing in the tournament. Questionable decisions in the match between Italy and South Korea resulted in 400,000 complaints, and featured in ESPN's 10 most fabled World Cup controversies. The match between Spain and South Korea featured two controversially disallowed Spanish goals, which Iván Helguera referred to as "a robbery" and led to Spanish press brandishing the officials "thieves of dreams", though FIFA dismissed the incident as human error.

Squads

This was the first World Cup that featured squads of 23 players, an increase from 22 previously. Of the 23 players, three must be goalkeepers.

Draw

The FIFA Organising Committee announced the eight seeded teams on 28 November 2001. The historic tradition to seed the hosts (Japan and South Korea) and holders (France) was upheld; while the remaining five seeds were granted to the other five of the top six teams, ranked by their results in the last three FIFA World Cups (ratio 3:2:1) and their FIFA World Ranking position in the last month of the past three years (equal ratio).

For the draw, the 32 teams were allocated into four pots; the eight top-seeded teams, were allocated in pot 1 and would be drawn/selected into the first position of the eight groups playing in the group stage. The remaining 24 unseeded teams, were allocated into three pots based on geographical sections, with the: 11 European teams in pot 2; two Asian teams and three South American teams in pot 3; three North American teams and five African teams in pot 4.

The general principle was to draw one team from each pot into the eight groups, although with special combined procedures for pot 2 and pot 3, due to comprising more/less than eight teams - but sixteen teams in total. At the same time, the draw also needed to respect the geographical limitation, that each group could not feature more than one team from each confederation, except for the European teams where the limitation was maximum two per group. Finally, special limitations were also stipulated to evenly distribute the presence of teams from each confederation between the groups playing respectively in Korea (group A-D) and Japan (group E-H); while China for political considerations only could be drawn for one of the groups playing in Korea.

 The draw took place at Busan Exhibition and Convention Center in South Korea, and was televised live on 1 December 2001: World Cup Draw 2002 on RTÉ.

The FIFA Organising Committee decided ahead of the draw, to place the defending champions (France) in Group A; while the co-hosts South Korea and Japan were placed respectively in Group D and Group H. The procedure for the draw comprised the following six steps:

 Pot 1 was used to draw, in alphabetic group order, the remaining five top-seeded teams for the first position of groups B, C, E, F and G; while respecting the restriction that one of the two South American seeds (Brazil and Argentina) had to play in a group played in South Korea (B/C) and the other had to play in a group played in Japan (E/F/G).
 Pot 2 was used to draw one European team to each of the eight groups (drawing unrestricted in the alphabetic order from A to H).
 As per the FIFA rule of only allowing a maximum of two European teams in each group, the remaining three European teams from Pot 2, was subject to a second draw, to be put in either of the four groups containing a top-seeded South American team or Asian team. This was done by first drawing the European team from Pot 2, and then drawing which seeded opponent the European team should be paired with, from a special bowl with four blue balls containing the names of Brazil, Argentina, Japan and South Korea.
 Pot 3 was used to draw one team to each of the five groups with an empty third slot (drawing in alphabetical order from A to H); while respecting the geographical restrictions, that: 
 None of the unseeded South American teams (Ecuador, Paraguay, Uruguay) from pot 3, could be drawn into a group with a seeded South American team (Brazil and Argentina).
 None of the unseeded Asian teams (Saudi Arabia and China) from pot 3, could be drawn into a group with a seeded Asian team (South Korea and Japan in Group D and H); along with the overall rule that China had to play in South Korea (meaning either group A, B or C) and that Saudi Arabia had to play in Japan (meaning either group E, F or G).
 Pot 4 was used to draw one team to each of the eight groups (drawing in the alphabetic order from A to H); while respecting the restrictions that:
 Minimum one North American team and minimum two African teams should be drawn to a group located in South Korea (Group A/B/C/D)
 Minimum one North American team and minimum two African teams should be drawn to a group located in Japan (Group E/F/G/H) 
 To decide the match schedules, the exact group position number for the un-seeded teams in each group (2, 3 or 4), were also drawn immediately from eight special group bowls, after each respective team had been drawn from pot 2, 3 and 4.

Besides of drawing the teams, the event also featured American vocalist Anastacia giving a debut public performance of the official song of the World Cup: Boom.

Draw results and group fixtures
The draw resulted in the following eight groups:

In each group, the teams played three matches, one against each of the other teams. Victories were granted 3 points, while a draw was equal to 1 point. After completion of the Group stage, the best two teams of each group advanced to the Round of 16 in the knockout stage, in a way so all group winners started out meeting a runner-up from one of the other groups. This format was identical with the tournament structure being used in 1998. A total of 64 games were played, including the final and a bronze medal game between the two semifinale losers.

Group F was considered the group of death, as it brought together Argentina, England, Nigeria and Sweden.

The fixtures for the Group stage were decided based on the draw results, as follows:

Group stage 
All times are Korea Standard Time and Japan Standard Time (UTC+9)
 

Groups A, B, C and D based in South Korea. Groups E, F, G and H based in Japan.

In the following tables:
Pld = total games played
W = total games won
D = total games drawn (tied)
L = total games lost
GF = total goals scored (goals for)
GA = total goals conceded (goals against)
GD = goal difference (GF−GA)
Pts = total points accumulated
The teams in the group play were ranked upon
 Points
 Greatest total goal difference in the three group matches
 Greatest number of goals scored in the three group matches
 Most points earned in matches against other teams in the tie
 Greatest goal difference in matches against other teams in the tie
 Greatest number of goals scored in matches against other teams in the tie
 Drawing of lots

In the original version of the rules for the final tournament, the ranking criteria were in a different order, with head-to-head results taking precedence over total goal difference. The rules were changed to the above in advance of the tournament, but older versions were still available on the FIFA and UEFA websites, causing some confusion among those trying to identify the correct criteria.

Group A

Group B

Group C

Group D

Group E

Group F

Group G

Group H

Knockout stage

For the second round, quarter-finals and semi-finals, the qualifiers from Groups A, C, F and H played their games in Japan while the qualifiers from Groups B, D, E and G played their games in South Korea. Daegu, South Korea, hosted the third-place match while Yokohama, Japan, hosted the final.

Round of 16 

In the round of 16, Germany beat Paraguay 1–0 with a late goal by Oliver Neuville in Seogwipo. England defeated Denmark in Niigata 3–0, with all goals occurring in the first half of the game. Sweden and Senegal faced off in Ōita and finished 1–1 in regular time and it took a golden goal from Henri Camara in extra time to settle the game for Senegal 2–1, which lead to Senegal becoming only the second African team to reach the last eight (after Cameroon in 1990). Spain and the Republic of Ireland played in Suwon, where Spain led most of the match 1–0 until a late penalty kick scored by Robbie Keane made the match go to extra time, where Spain emerged victorious in a penalty shoot-out. The United States beat CONCACAF rivals Mexico 2–0 in Jeonju with Brian McBride and Landon Donovan scoring the goals. Brazil defeated Belgium 2–0 in Kobe, with an amazing volley by Rivaldo and a splendid counter-attack goal by Ronaldo. Turkey ended co-hosts Japan's run with a 1–0 win in Miyagi, thanks to an Ümit Davala goal in the 12th minute. The other co-hosts, South Korea, defeated Italy 2–1 in extra time in Daejeon with a goal by Ahn Jung-hwan in the 117th minute. South Korea's win ensured that, for the very first time in the Cup's history, teams from five continents – Europe, North America, South America, Africa and Asia – reached the quarter-finals of the same tournament.

Quarter-finals 

In the quarter-finals, England and Brazil squared off in Shizuoka, where Ronaldinho scored a free-kick goal over England's David Seaman early in the second half as Brazil won 2–1. The United States lost to Germany 1–0 in Ulsan by a Michael Ballack goal in the 39th minute, but controversy surrounded the game when United States demanded the referee give a penalty for a goal-line handball by Torsten Frings in the 49th minute, but the referee did not award the penalty. South Korea got another success in Gwangju in a controversial manner, overcoming Spain 5–3 on penalties after a 0–0 draw in which the Spaniards twice thought they had scored while onside; however, the efforts were disallowed by the referee with controversial decisions. While the decisions were marginal, in both incidents the Korean players stopped playing after seeing the flag raised, allowing the goals to be scored. The hosts became the first team in the Asian Football Confederation to reach the semi-finals of the World Cup, eclipsing the record of their North Korean counterparts who reached the quarter-finals in 1966. They also became the first World Cup semi-final team not from UEFA or CONMEBOL since the United States did it in the first World Cup in 1930. Turkey defeated Senegal 1–0 in Osaka, with a golden goal scored by İlhan Mansız in the 94th minute.

Semi-finals 

The semi-finals saw 1–0 games; the first semi-final, played in Seoul, saw Michael Ballack's goal suffice for Germany to eliminate South Korea. However, Ballack had already received a yellow card during the match before, which forced him to miss the final based on accumulated yellow cards. The next day in Saitama saw Ronaldo score a goal early in the second half, his sixth of the competition for Brazil, to defeat Turkey in a replay of their Group C encounter.

Third place play-off 
In the third-place match in Daegu, Turkey beat the South Koreans 3–2, their first goal coming from Hakan Şükür straight from the opening kick-off (even though South Korea kicked off) in 10.8 seconds, the fastest ever goal in World Cup history.

Final 

In the final match held in Yokohama, Japan, two goals from Ronaldo secured the World Cup for Brazil as they claimed victory over Germany. Ronaldo scored twice in the second half and, after the game, won the Golden Shoe award for the tournament's leading scorer with eight goals. This was the fifth time Brazil had won the World Cup, cementing their status as the most successful national team in the history of the competition. Brazil became the only team since Argentina in 1986 to win the trophy without needing to win a penalty shoot-out at some stage during the knockout phase and the total number of penalty shoot-outs (2) was the lowest since the four-round knockout format was introduced in 1986. Brazil also became the first team to win every match at a World Cup since 1970 and set a new record for highest aggregate goal difference (+14) for a World Cup winner. Brazil's captain Cafu, who became the first player to appear in three successive World Cup finals, accepted the trophy on behalf of the team.

Statistics

Goalscorers
Ronaldo won the Golden Shoe after scoring eight goals. In total, 161 goals were scored by 109 players, with three of them credited as own goals. Two of those own goals were in the same match, marking the first time in FIFA World Cup history that own goals had been scored by both teams in the same match.

Disciplinary statistics

Awards

1Oliver Kahn is the only goalkeeper to have won the Golden Ball in FIFA World Cup history.

All-star team

Final standings
After the tournament, FIFA published a ranking of all teams that competed in the 2002 World Cup finals based on progress in the competition, overall results and quality of the opposition.

Marketing

Sponsorship
The sponsors of the 2002 FIFA World Cup are divided into three categories: FIFA World Cup Sponsors and South Korea and Japan Supporters.

Ticket sales problem
The original domestic ticket allocation had fully sold out and the organising committee completed sales of tickets returned from the international allocation by the end of April. However, there were a significant number of empty seats at the opening matches. It was gradually revealed that the World Cup Ticketing Bureau (WCTB) still had unsold tickets in its possession. After FIFA agreed to sell this inventory, JAWOC undertook sales over telephone and WCTB handled the internet sales. For the second round Japan vs. Turkey match in Miyagi in particular, although it was reported by both parties that all tickets had been sold, some 700 seats remained empty.

Symbols

Mascot
The official mascot of this World Cup was "Ato, Kaz, and Nik" (The Spheriks), orange, purple, and blue (respectively) futuristic, computer-generated creatures. Collectively, members of a team of "Atmosball" (a fictional football-like sport), Ato is the coach while Kaz and Nik are players. The three individual names were selected from shortlists by users on the Internet and at McDonald's outlets in the host countries.

Match ball

The official match ball was "Fevernova", manufactured by Adidas.

Music
The official song was "Boom". The official local song of this World Cup was "Let's Get Together Now". The official anthem was "Anthem".

Cultural event

The official FIFA cultural event of the 2002 World Cup was a flag festival called Poetry of the Winds. Held in Nanjicheon Park, an area of the World Cup Park close to Seoul World Cup Stadium, Poetry of the Winds was exhibited from 29 May to 25 June in order to wish success upon the World Cup and promote a festive atmosphere. During the flag art festival, hand-painted flags from global artists were displayed as a greeting to international guests in a manner that was designed to promote harmony (2002 Flag Art Festival Executive Committee).

Concerns 

The World Cup was originally going to be hosted either in Japan or in South Korea, but in the end both rivals had decided to share the hosting duties thus making this World Cup the first to have multiple host nations. However, there were concerns regarding the selection of hosts due to logistical issues caused by fans traveling across two separate sovereign nations as well as whether some of the 20 stadiums to be constructed for the World Cup would be ready in time for it or not. While political and infrastructural problems were eventually overcome, there still remained the issue of East Asia's wet season which could disrupt the play. The timing of the tournament thus had been altered to mitigate as much as possible against such issues, with the tournament kicking off on May 31 and due to run until June 30, the earliest date for a World Cup final since 1986. 

The time difference caused issues for fans worldwide especially in Europe, where people had to go to work when matches were played.

Aftermath and legacy

The tournament had a major economic impact on both South Korea and Japan, generating an estimated US$1.3 billion in revenue. Spending from World Cup tourists in South Korea created US$307 million in direct income and US$713 million in valued added. Japan spent an estimated US$5.6 billion on preparations for the event, which had a US$24.8 billion impact on the Japanese economy and accounted for 0.6% of their GDP in 2002.

See also 

 2002 FIFA World Cup broadcasting rights
 Adidas Fevernova – match ball
 The Official Album of the 2002 FIFA World Cup
 The Doraemons movies: Goal! Goal! Goal!! (2002 FIFA World Cup movies)

References

Notes

External links

2002 FIFA World Cup Official Website (archived)
2002 FIFA World Cup Korea/Japan  , FIFA.com
FIFA Technical Report (Part 1) and (Part 2)
RSSSF Archive of finals
RSSSF Archive of qualifying rounds

 
FIFA World Cup tournaments
International association football competitions hosted by South Korea
International association football competitions hosted by Japan
Japan–South Korea relations
2002 in South Korean football
FIFA World Cup
May 2002 sports events in Asia
June 2002 sports events in Asia